Gregory Cristophe Fergus  (born May 31, 1969) is a Canadian Liberal politician, who was elected to represent the riding of Hull—Aylmer in the House of Commons of Canada in the 2015 federal election.

Early life
Fergus’ grandfather immigrated to Canada from the British protectorate of Montserrat. Fergus studied at public English elementary schools, Westpark and Sunnydale, and later attended Lindsay Place High School. After a teachers’ strike affected his schooling, his parents decided to send him to Selwyn House School, a private boys’ school, followed by Marianopolis College, and he later earned two bachelor's degrees from the University of Ottawa and Carleton University. At Selwyn House, which he attended from Grade 9 to 11, he was classmates with entrepreneurs Vincenzo Guzzo, Mark Pathy and Michael Penner, who later served as chairman of Hydro-Québec.

Fergus was president of the Young Liberals of Canada from 1994 to 1996, where he attracted attention for supporting the passage of a motion calling on the Liberal Party to support same-sex marriage. After attending university and earning bachelor's degrees in social science and international relations, he worked for Liberal cabinet ministers Pierre Pettigrew and Jim Peterson. In 2007, Stéphane Dion named him the national director of the Liberal Party.

Political career

In the 2015 federal election, Fergus was nominated as the Liberal candidate in Hull—Aylmer, a traditionally Liberal riding that had fallen to the New Democratic Party in the previous election. The contest was attended by some controversy, as NDP incumbent Nycole Turmel accused Fergus' campaign of spreading rumours that she was terminally ill, which Fergus denied. Fergus won the election by over 11,000 votes in a race that was expected to be close by the New Democratic Party  and Liberals.

Electoral record

References

External links
 Official Website
 

1969 births
Living people
Anglophone Quebec people
Black Canadian politicians
Liberal Party of Canada MPs
Members of the House of Commons of Canada from Quebec
Politicians from Gatineau
Politicians from Montreal
21st-century Canadian politicians
Canadian people of Montserratian descent
Members of the King's Privy Council for Canada